The Baikal Mountains or Baikal Range (Bajkaljskij hrebet; , Baigalai dabaan) are a mountain range that rises steeply over the northwestern shore of Lake Baikal in southern Siberia, Russia. The highest peak in the range is 2,572 m high Mount Chersky, named after Russian explorer Ivan Chersky.

Geography
The Baikal Mountains are connected with the Primorsky Range to the south, which also stretches along the lakeshore. The Akitkan Range, part of the North Baikal Highlands, is a northern extension of the mountain chain.
These mountains are the origin of the Lena River. The Lena-Angara Plateau, part of the Central Siberian Plateau, lies to the west of the Baikal Mountains.

Flora
The mountain slopes near Lake Baikal are densely wooded with grey alder, Eurasian aspen, downy birch, Siberian larch, Siberian fir, Scots pine, and Siberian spruce.

Notes

External links
The Republic of Buryatia
Photo
Photos of lake and mountain areas

Mountain ranges of Russia
Landforms of Irkutsk Oblast
Landforms of Buryatia
South Siberian Mountains